Sir George Beresford Craddock (7 October 1898 – 22 September 1976) was a British Conservative politician.  He was elected as Member of Parliament (MP) for Spelthorne at the 1950 general election, and held the seat until his retirement at the 1970 general election.  He should not be confused with George Craddock, the Labour politician who served as an MP at the same time.

Early life and career
Craddock was educated at Harris Academy, Dundee and St Andrews University, Scotland, where he gained a First in Physics and Chemistry (BSc), with special distinction in Chemistry, and an MA in Economics and Philosophy. In the First World War he first served in the Royal Garrison Artillery, then as a Staff Lieutenant, Royal Engineers Chemical Warfare Staff. He held major business executive posts in India and Africa, 1921–39. During the Second World War he was Assistant Director at the Ministry of Supply.

He became Barrister at Law, Gray's Inn, from 1947 with chambers in the Middle Temple.

Political career
His political ambitions had surfaced in the 1930s when he contested Lichfield, Staffordshire, for the National Government in a by-election (as National Labour) in 1938 and contested the same seat in 1945 as a National candidate. He was elected to Parliament as Conservative member for the Spelthorne Division of Middlesex in 1950 and held the seat until his retirement in 1970. He was Parliamentary Private Secretary to Harold Watkinson, Minister of Transport and Civil Aviation, 1956–9, and to Watkinson as Minister of Defence, 1959–62. He was a member of the Speaker's Panel of Chairmen, 1966–70.

He is often remembered for his controversial speech:
“Let us remember that 95% of them are primitive people. One of the reasons why they are not generally accepted into hotels is because their sanitary habits are not all that could be desired… It is well known that a large number of Africans in East and Central Africa are riddled with a disease of a very unfortunate kind… I will not dwell on that very delicate subject but I think that Honorable Members who have experience will agree that the attitude of the African towards women and sexual matters is entirely different from the attitude of the general run of Europeans… it is a common practice among Africans to put children to sleep by excitation of their urogenital organs… The effect of alcohol upon an African is remarkable. I admit that sometimes alcohol has a remarkable effect on Europeans. But speaking generally, alcohol seems to bring out all the evil instincts in the African in the most astonishing way… these views and practices are due to the psychological makeup of those primitive people from time immemorial.”
B. Craddock, House of Commons, May 1953.

Personal life
Craddock married Ethel Martin Bradford in 1936.

He was knighted on 8 July 1960.

His home in later life was Henley Down House, Battle, Sussex. Like many Conservative MPs he was a member of the Carlton Club.

References

Who's Who, London : A. & C. Black, 1974;

External links 
 

1898 births
1976 deaths
Conservative Party (UK) MPs for English constituencies
National Labour (UK) politicians
Borough of Spelthorne
UK MPs 1950–1951
UK MPs 1951–1955
UK MPs 1955–1959
UK MPs 1959–1964
UK MPs 1964–1966
UK MPs 1966–1970
People educated at Harris Academy
Alumni of the University of St Andrews
Politicians from Dundee
Knights Bachelor